Marilita Lambropoulou (Marilíta Lampropoúlou), born July 15, 1974 in Athens, Greece is a Greek actress. She is very popular with home audiences for her work in films like Athens Blues (Μια Μέρα τη Νύχτα, Mia Mera ti Nychta), directed by Giorgos Panousopoulos (2002) and The King (Ο Βασιλιάς, O Vasilias), directed by Nikos Grammatikos (2002), for which she won the "Quality Award".

Marilita trained at the Theatre Studies Department of the University of Patras, as well as at a series of seminars organised by the National Theatre. Her stage work includes roles in both classical and contemporary theatre, most recently in Bat’s The House of the Sleeping Girls at the Amore Theater. Marilita has also directed theatre, including The Caretaker by Harold Pinter and Psychology of the Syrian Husband by Emmanuil Roidis. She has acted in television in such leads roles as Maria in the television film, Three Wishes (Tρεις Eυχές, Treis Evches). For the last 5 years she has been acting in leading roles in both comedy and drama series for TV. In 2003 she represented Greece in Berlin and was voted as one of Europeas film Shooting Stars by the European Film Promotion.

Filmography

Television

External links
Official Site
Fan Club

1974 births
Living people
Actresses from Athens
Greek film actresses
Greek television actresses
University of Patras alumni